"Margical History Tour" is the eleventh episode of the fifteenth season of the American animated television series The Simpsons. It first aired on the Fox network in the United States on February 8, 2004. This is one of several Simpsons episodes that features mini-stories.

Plot
Marge takes Bart, Lisa, and Milhouse to the library to study. When they go inside, they realize that the library has removed all the books except for the popular ones. Marge makes the best of this situation by telling stories about history.

Henry VIII
King Henry VIII (Homer) is a gluttonous slob who stuffs his face while singing, "I'm Henery the Eighth, I am." A herald (Sideshow Mel) announces the entrance of Henry's wife, Queen Margerine of Aragon (Marge), who tells him to stop singing. Henry wipes his face with Magna Carta and gripes that Margerine has born him only a daughter (Lisa). That night Henry dreams of a son (Bart) and strangles him, screaming, "Get out of my dreams and into my wife!"

When Anne Boleyn (Lindsay Naegle) promises to produce a son were she his wife, Margerine intervenes and drags Henry to a marriage counselor (Doctor Hibbert). Henry explains that he wants to marry Anne, but cannot execute his wife because her father is the King of Spain. The counselor tells him that while his feelings are valid, marriage is hard work. Henry then threatens to behead the terrified counselor, who quickly reverses his position.

The Lord Chancellor, Sir Thomas More (Ned Flanders), protests that divorce is not permitted in Roman Catholic Church. The King retorts that he will start his own Church. More objects, prompting Henry to "cannon-ize" him in honor of his principles by shooting him out of a cannon from the roof of Hampton Court.

Henry's new Church grants him his divorce, yet Margerine's lawyer (the Blue-Haired Lawyer) orders Henry to give half of his kingdom to Margerine; he rips a map of the British Isles in half, giving her Ireland. As Henry marries Anne Boleyn, the Archbishop of Canterbury (Reverend Lovejoy) alters the Sign of the Cross by saying, "In the Name of the Henry, the Hank, and the Holy Harry. Amen...Henry."

Nine months later, Anne bears Henry another daughter, and is quickly beheaded by an executioner (Chief Wiggum) on Tower Hill. Henry marries a total of six times, including to the squeaky-voiced Jane Seymour (Miss Springfield), the unfeminine Anne of Cleves (Otto Mann), and the elderly Catherine Parr (Agnes Skinner). He still fails to produce a male heir, and executes his wives whenever he tires of them. This prompts a courtier (Moe Szyslak) to inform Henry nervously that they are running out of pikes, resulting in his own beheading.

Finally, in a scene set to the tune of "Greensleeves," Henry is old and sick, lying in his bed with Margerine by his side. He apologizes for having locked her up in a dungeon and asks her to become his Queen again. Margerine accepts tenderly, then violently smothers Henry with a pillow.

Milhouse leaves eagerly to start his school report on Henry VIII, only to be tripped by Nelson, who steals his notes.

Lewis and Clark and Sacagawea
Meriwether Lewis (Lenny) and William Clark (Carl) are assigned to explore the West by President Thomas Jefferson (Mayor Quimby). They meet a tribe of Native Americans, whose chief (Homer) offers them the guidance of his daughter, Sacagawea (Lisa), whose name means, "Little know-it-all who will not shut her maizehole." They are accompanied by her husband (Milhouse), until he is slaughtered by Sacagawea's brother (Bart).

Sacagawea gives them many tips on how to survive the land, including how to scare a mountain lion, but quickly becomes fed up with Lewis and Clark's stupidity. Finally, she leaves them and sets off back home. She encounters a mountain lion, but before it can attack, Lewis and Clark save her using the advice she gave them. The party arrives at the Pacific Ocean and a heavy downpour begins, prompting Lewis and Clark to name the rain-soaked place Eugene, Oregon. The two explorers promised Sacagawea national recognition, but it was not until modern day that she was retrospectively honoured with the creation of the Sacagawea dollar – which Marge explains can be exchanged at the bank for a real dollar.

Mozart and Salieri
Wolfgang Amadeus Mozart (Bart Simpson) is a big hit in Vienna, playing sonatas on the grand piano and pushed along by his overbearing, money-hungry father (Homer Simpson). Antonio Salieri (Lisa Simpson) is resentful of her brother's talents, especially when Mozart wins the award for best composer. At Mozart's flatulence-themed opera, The Musical Fruit, Salieri serves the Emperor (Montgomery Burns) drugged wine. The opera is a success until the foppish audience sees the Emperor asleep and mimics him, leaving Mozart stunned.

The failure of his opera leads to Mozart's fall from popularity, after which he develops a high fever and becomes deathly ill, enduring heavy leechings at the hands of an incompetent doctor (Dr. Nick Riviera). At her brother's deathbed, Salieri tells him she wanted to ruin his life, not kill him. Mozart confesses that he thought highly of Salieri's work, believing that it would be remembered more than his – but his youthful death ensures he and his music will be immortalized forever. He then says, "Eat my pantaloons", and dies. The next day, Salieri visits the Emperor's court to submit Mozart's Requiem as her own. The Emperor, however, is already focused on Ludwig van Beethoven (Nelson Muntz), whose performance of "Ode to Joy" on the piano prompts him to declare all other music obsolete, to which, Beethoven laughs at Salieri to the tune of the opening of Symphony No. 5. Crushed, Salieri throws the Requiem away, boards a carriage filled with lunatics, and laughs maniacally as it drives away.

Epilogue
Lisa realizes that Marge's telling of the lives of Mozart and Salieri is clearly based upon the movie Amadeus. She calls the movie completely inaccurate, explaining that Mozart worked hard on his music and that Salieri was a celebrated composer in his own time. Homer recalls that Tom Hulce starred both in Amadeus and in Animal House, and he sings an inaccurate rendition of the Animal House theme over the epilogue.

The episode ends with a facetious epilogue followed by closing credits accompanied by Mozart's Eine kleine Nachtmusik:

Cultural references
Some items seen in the library are 'Everybody Poops: The Video, Yu-Gi-Oh! Price Guides, and Itchy & Scratchy books on tape.

The title of the episode is a satire of The Beatles' movie, song, and album Magical Mystery Tour.

When King Henry first appears, he is gorging himself while singing the 1911 music hall song “I'm Henery the Eighth, I Am”. The lyrics, however, are altered to refer to the King's enormous appetite and reputation for gluttony. Henry also wipes his face with Magna Carta, a document which limits the power of the Monarchy and forms the basis of the Constitution of the United Kingdom. During King Henry's dream about his son, a brief snatch of the song, "Greensleeves" can be heard. While in the marriage counselor's office, Henry is reading a magazine called The Yorker, a send-up of The New Yorker, until Margerine reminds him that they've come to talk about their problems. The Sir Thomas More subplot is a satire of Fred Zinnemann's Academy Award-winning film, A Man for All Seasons, starring Paul Scofield as Sir Thomas and Robert Shaw as King Henry. Later, in a dig at Tudor anti-Catholicism, Henry watches a Punch and Judy-style show in which Itchy & Scratchy accuse each other of conducting an illegal Catholic Mass and for refusing to sign the Act of Supremacy.

As Lisa points out at the end of the episode, the Mozart segment is a satire of Peter Shaffer's stage play Amadeus and Miloš Forman's Academy Award-winning film of the same name. During Mozart's first concert, Otto Mann calls out a request for "Sonata in A, K.331". In reality, the K numbering system for Mozart's work was not introduced until 70 years after Mozart's death. Later, Salieri is compared to the three "untalented" Mozarts—Randy, Jermaine, and Tito from the Jackson Five. Mozart's opera "The Musical Fruit" is a satire of both The Magic Flute, and the children's song "Beans, Beans, the Musical Fruit," while the opera is sung to the tune of his composition Eine kleine Nachtmusik, which also plays over the closing credits. A fragment from the movement Lacrimosa from Mozart's Requiem can be heard while Mozart is dying. When Salieri arrives at the Imperial Palace, the Emperor is listening to Beethoven perform the Ode to Joy from his 9th Symphony on the piano. When the Emperor declares all other music obsolete, Beethoven points at Salieri and "Haw Haws" to the opening of his 5th Symphony.

The epilogue is similar to the one from Animal House''.

External links 

 
 Margical History Tour Script on Springfield! Springfield!

The Simpsons (season 15) episodes
2004 American television episodes
Tudor England in popular culture
Cultural depictions of Henry VIII
Cultural depictions of Anne Boleyn
Cultural depictions of Catherine of Aragon
Cultural depictions of Thomas Jefferson
Uxoricide in fiction
Fiction about regicide
Cultural depictions of Meriwether Lewis and William Clark
Cultural depictions of Ludwig van Beethoven
Wolfgang Amadeus Mozart in fiction
Cultural depictions of Wolfgang Amadeus Mozart
Cultural depictions of Antonio Salieri
Cultural depictions of Joseph II, Holy Roman Emperor
Fratricide in fiction
Television episodes set in Oregon
Television episodes set in Vienna
Television episodes set in England